Martin Miller (born 25 September 1997) is an Estonian professional footballer who plays as a midfielder for Estonian Meistriliiga club Flora and the Estonia national team.

Club career

Tammeka
Miller came through the Tammeka youth academy. He made his debut in the Meistriliiga on 20 May 2014, in a 0–6 home loss to Sillamäe Kalev. Miller scored his first Meistriliiga goal on 7 July 2014, scoring the winning goal in Tammeka's 2–1 away win over Narva Trans. He played in every match of the 2016 season, scoring three goals.

Flora
On 13 November 2016, Miller signed a three-year contract with Flora. He helped Flora win the Meistriliiga title in 2017.
On November 25, 2021 he scored the goal that allowed Flora to beat Partizan Belgrade 1-0 in the fifth game of the 2021-22 UEFA Conference League group stage, which was historic because this meant that Flora became the first ever Estonian team to win a game in a UEFA group stage.

International career
Miller has represented Estonia at under-19, under-21 and under-23 levels. He made his senior international debut for Estonia on 22 November 2016, in a 1–0 away victory over Antigua and Barbuda in a friendly. On 19 November 2017, he scored his first international goal in a 2–0 away win over Fiji.

International goals
As of 20 November 2017. Estonia score listed first, score column indicates score after each Miller goal.

Honours

Club
Flora
Meistriliiga: 2017, 2019, 2020
Estonian Cup: 2019–20
Estonian Supercup: 2020, 2021

References

External links

1997 births
Living people
Sportspeople from Tartu
Estonian footballers
Association football midfielders
Esiliiga players
Meistriliiga players
Tartu JK Tammeka players
FC Flora players
Estonia youth international footballers
Estonia under-21 international footballers
Estonia international footballers